is a Japanese professional footballer who plays as a midfielder for J1 League club FC Tokyo.

Career
Koki Tsukagawa joined J2 League club Fagiano Okayama in 2017.

Club statistics
Updated to 22 July 2022.

Honours

Club
J1 League: 2021
Japanese Super Cup: 2021

References

External links

1994 births
Living people
Ryutsu Keizai University alumni
Association football people from Hiroshima Prefecture
Japanese footballers
J1 League players
J2 League players
Fagiano Okayama players
Matsumoto Yamaga FC players
FC Gifu players
Kawasaki Frontale players
FC Tokyo players
Association football midfielders